The women's 800 metres at the 1969 European Athletics Championships was held in Athens, Greece, at Georgios Karaiskakis Stadium on 16 and 18 September 1969.

Medalists

Results

Final
18 September

Heats
16 September

Heat 1

Heat 2

Heat 3

Participation
According to an unofficial count, 15 athletes from 13 countries participated in the event.

 (1)
 (2)
 (1)
 (1)
 (1)
 (1)
 (1)
 (1)
 (1)
 (1)
 (1)
 (2)
 (1)

References

800 metres
800 metres at the European Athletics Championships
Euro